Prudent Bettens (4 July 1943 – 20 September 2010) was a Belgian footballer. He played in three matches for the Belgium national football team from 1967 to 1968.

References

External links
 

1943 births
2010 deaths
Belgian footballers
Belgium international footballers
Place of birth missing
Association football midfielders